Seungsu Han (born September 10, 1986) is an American professional golfer who plays on the Japan Golf Tour. He won the 2017 Casio World Open and the end-of-season 2020 LG Signature Players Championship on the Korean Tour.

Amateur career
Han was born in South Korea. He attended the University of Nevada-Las Vegas. Han turned professional after earning a place on the 2009 Nationwide Tour.

Professional career
Han had an unsuccessful first season on the Nationwide Tour, making the cut in only 6 out of 24 events he played and failing to retain his place on the tour. He played on the Asian Tour in 2010, again with little success. He played a few events on the Canadian Tour in 2012 and on the Japan Golf Tour in 2014.

Han played on the Japan Golf Tour again in 2016 with more success and has played regularly on the tour since then. His best season on the tour was 2017 when he won the Casio World Open, was runner-up twice and third a further three times. He finished the season 5th in the money list. He was also a runner-up in the Genesis Championship on the 2017 Korean Tour. His good performances in 2017 lifted him into the top 100 of the world rankings in late 2017 and for the first half of 2018, earning him an invitation to the 2018 PGA Championship, his first major championship. After a first round 74 he had a 66 to just make the cut and after further rounds of 66 and 72 he finished in a tie for 50th place.

Amateur wins
2006 Porter Cup

Professional wins (2)

Japan Golf Tour wins (1)

Japan Golf Tour playoff record (0–2)

Korean Tour wins (1)

References

External links 
 
 
 

American male golfers
UNLV Rebels men's golfers
Japan Golf Tour golfers
Asian Tour golfers
Sportspeople from Incheon
1986 births
Living people